Twum is a surname. Notable people with the surname include:

Ceccy Twum, Ghanaian singer and songwriter
Isaac Twum (born 1998), Ghanaian footballer
Monica Twum (born 1978), Ghanaian track and field sprinter